The Infection is the fifth studio album by American heavy metal band Chimaira. Released in the US on April 20, 2009 and worldwide on April 24, it reached position 30 on the Billboard 200 charts on its first week of release, selling around 15,000 copies. This was improvement from the previous album's debut at No. 42. It is also their last album to feature long time bassist Jim Lamarca, drummer Andols Herrick, as well as longtime keyboard player Chris Spicuzza.

Promotion
Within the order of promoting the album, the band revealed a track name from the album and a piece of the album cover on the main page of their website approximately every other day. The final track and entire cover were revealed on February 12, 2009. "Secrets of the Dead" was released as a single on iTunes March 3, 2009 and was first played for the public at their Chimaira Christmas show in Cleveland, Ohio. The song "Destroy and Dominate" was played live for the first time on Friday, March 6, 2009 at the Dubai Desert Rock Festival 2009. "Destroy and Dominate" was released for free on Chimaira's official Twitter profile on March 16, 2009 for one hour only. On April 16, 2009 Chimaira released the first nine tracks of The Infection on their MySpace profile for listening. The song, "On Broken Glass" is available as downloadable content for Guitar Hero World Tour.

Production
Rob Arnold told Kerrang! that "Try To Survive" was the first song written for the album.

All songs on the album were written in drop C except for Destroy and Dominate, The Disappearing Sun, and Try to Survive, which were written in drop B.

Fan involvement
In order to further involve the fans and promote the album, Chimaira released the stem files that were used to create the "Destroy and Dominate" music video. Fans were asked to create their own version of the music video. The members of the band chose their favorites and the prizes went as follows:

1st Place: The Infection (Deluxe Tin Box) and two concert tickets to see Chimaira
2nd Place: Two concert tickets to see Chimaira or a Chimaira T-Shirt
3rd Place: Two concert tickets to see Chimaira or a Chimaira T-Shirt

Track listing

Limited deluxe fan edition
This is a special "Briefcase" version of the album, only 580 are said to be made and the first 100 bought are signed by the band, extra features include:
 Metal Briefcase packaging
 Chimaira Infection Logo Flag
 CD/DVD Edition of the album (Features the bonus track "Revenge" and a "Making of" DVD)
 "Syringe" USB in metal box featuring the bonus tracks "Convictions" and "Warpath", The Infection demos, Wallpapers, Buddy Icons and more
 Guitar Pick Pack featuring signature picks of all guitarists
 Booklet featuring never before seen photos of the band in studio
 Laminate

Charts

Personnel
Chimaira
 Mark Hunter – vocals
 Rob Arnold – lead guitar
 Matt DeVries – rhythm guitar
 Jim LaMarca – bass guitar
 Andols Herrick – drums
 Chris Spicuzza – keyboards, electronics
Additional Musicians
Jason Popson – vocals on Convictions
Production
Produced by Ben Schigel, Mark Hunter and Rob Arnold at Spider Studios
Engineered by Tony Gammalo
Mixed by Chris "Zeuss" Harris at Planet Z Studios
Mastered by Ted Jensen at Sterling Sound
Photography by Todd Bell and Rob Dobi
Design concept by Chris Spicuzza and Mark Hunter

References

2009 albums
Chimaira albums
Ferret Music albums
Nuclear Blast albums